Spialia delagoae, the Delagoa sandman or Delagoa grizzled skipper, is a butterfly of the family Hesperiidae. It is found in Namibia, Botswana, Transvaal, Eswatini, KwaZulu-Natal, Zimbabwe, Mozambique and Kenya. The habitat consists of moist and dry savanna.

The wingspan is 21–24 mm for males and 24–28 mm for females. There are two generations per year with peaks from February to March and from August to September.

References

Spialia
Butterflies described in 1898
Butterflies of Africa
Taxa named by Roland Trimen